The Greenhouse–Geisser correction  is a statistical method of adjusting for lack of sphericity in a repeated measures ANOVA. The correction functions as both an estimate of epsilon (sphericity) and a correction for lack of sphericity. The correction was proposed by Samuel Greenhouse and Seymour Geisser in 1959.

The Greenhouse–Geisser correction is an estimate of sphericity. If sphericity is met, then . If sphericity is not met, then epsilon will be less than 1 (and the degrees of freedom will be overestimated and the F-value will be inflated). To correct for this inflation, multiply the Greenhouse–Geisser estimate of epsilon to the degrees of freedom used to calculate the F critical value.

An alternative correction that is believed to be less conservative is the Huynh–Feldt correction (1976). As a general rule of thumb, the Greenhouse–Geisser correction is the preferred correction method when the epsilon estimate is below 0.75. Otherwise, the Huynh–Feldt correction is preferred.

See also
 Mauchly's sphericity test
 Multivariate analysis of variance (MANOVA)

References

Estimation methods